Catman (Thomas Reese Blake) is a character appearing in comic books published by DC Comics. He is part of Batman’s growing roster of enemies, debuting in the mid-1960s.

For decades, the character rarely appeared in comic books, as Batman stories returned to darker themes. A modern revival of the character in the pages of Green Arrow many years later depicted a Catman down on his luck, clinging to past glories, overweight, and pathetic.

In 2006, however, the character was rehabilitated by writer Gail Simone, depicting Blake as having picked himself up from the gutter, restoring his physical fitness and gaining a new sense of purpose and dignity while living with lions in Africa. Stories since then have depicted him as an attractive and capable antihero, and leader of the mercenary team Secret Six.

Publication history
Catman first appeared in Detective Comics #311 (January 1963) and was created by Bill Finger and Jim Mooney.

A different Cat-Man once opposed the Blackhawks in Blackhawk #141, but he has no connection with the more prominent Batman villain.

Fictional character biography

Origins

Pre-Crisis
Catman was originally Thomas Reese Blake, a world-famous trapper of jungle cats who turned to crime because he had grown bored with hunting and had squandered most of his millions. He became a burglar who committed his crimes in a catsuit made out of an ancient African cloth. His costume was modeled after Catwoman's disguise. Catwoman was none too pleased to have her modus operandi copied, which resulted in Selina Kyle (Catwoman) being wrongly implicated for Catman's crimes at least once, and so she initially helped Batman against him.

As with many Batman villains in their first appearances, Catman was originally a gimmicked villain who stole items along a "cat" theme, such as cat statues, "cat's eyes" emeralds, etc. His weapon of choice was a pair of steel claw-tipped gloves and the razor edged "catarang".

Catman would reappear once more, this time revealing that the orange African cloth in his uniform gave him nine lives. The character first shows his capability for good causes when he rescues Batwoman from nearly dying. He gives her some of his costume fabric, believing she too will have nine lives. He resumes his criminalistic ways, but Batwoman (temporarily infiltrating his trust to be his new partner, with a new costume as "Cat-Woman") reasons the entire cloth has only nine lives, not individual pieces, and manipulates events until Catman only has one remaining, causing him to turn himself in.

Outcast
In 1992, Catman appeared in Batman: Shadow of the Bat as a member of a team called "the Misfits", led by Killer Moth. The Misfits were portrayed as third-rate villains trying to prove themselves, foreshadowing Brad Meltzer's treatment of the character in Green Arrow.

Catman reappeared in a 1995 crossover between Shadow of the Bat and Catwoman. In this story, the cloth that Catman's costume was made from was retconned as belonging to a South Sea cat cult. Catwoman was hired by the cult to return the cloth, but gave them a fake.

Catman remained in limbo until 2003, when he resurfaced as a foe of Green Arrow. Written by Brad Meltzer, Catman was portrayed as a pathetic, overweight loser who was looked down upon by other villains and who is easily defeated by Green Arrow. His hair had been dyed black, which he thought "made [him] look tougher".

Monsieur Mallah sends Warp to abduct Blake, the implication being that Catman had met a rather grisly end as Mallah's dinner; this situation is alluded to by Blake, when he joins the Secret Six: "You know you've hit rock bottom when a monkey and a Frenchman don't consider you worth killing". When he later meets Monsieur Mallah, he comments that he has no desire to see the gorilla's stomach again.

Secret Six
In the 2005 mini-series Villains United, Catman resurfaced in Africa, where he attempted to resalvage his life and began living with a pride of lions. He used this time to lose weight and regain his sense of self-worth and fighting skills. This 'perfect existence' would be shattered by the arrival of the Secret Society of Super Villains, however. Seeking to unite all of Earth's super-villains under his control, Lex Luthor (secretly Alexander Luthor, Jr. of the original Earth-Three in disguise) sought to recruit Catman into the fold as a minion, only to be rejected. It was initially believed that an angry Lex Luthor had Deathstroke kill the lions Catman was living with in retaliation for being rejected by a "nobody" but this was later revealed to have been a misdirection.

Catman vowed revenge against Luthor, and was subsequently recruited into a criminal syndicate known as the Secret Six. Together, the Secret Six waged war against the Secret Society of Super Villains under the direction of an individual known only as Mockingbird. During that time he found out that it was in fact fellow Secret Six member Deadshot who had killed his lions, so that he would join the organization. Deadshot would later apologize, and Catman forgave him. Although the two were reluctant allies at first, the two soon bonded and became what one could loosely call friends.

Under Villains United writer Gail Simone, Catman has achieved a new level of fame. Portrayed as a cunning warrior with a sense of honor, the character is now a potent antihero. He is depicted with physical abilities that allow him to fight Mallah to a standstill and to blind Captain Nazi.

He is different from most other Batman villains in the sense that he has noble and heroic qualities. While Cheshire notes that Blake behaves more like a hero than a villain, he sees heroes such as the Justice League as being arrogant and abusive of their power, as seen when he confronts Green Arrow about the Doctor Light incident. It has been revealed that during his time with the Six he impregnated Cheshire and that the two now have a son, Thomas Jr.

In Gail Simone's Birds of Prey #104, the Secret Six run into Barbara Gordon's team. Huntress and Catman – out of disguise – dance together, with hints of an attraction. The two teams battle, six members for six, Catman paired against Huntress amidst sexual innuendo, but the fray ends with the resurrection of Ice. Commenting upon Catman's reasonings, Knockout claimed that he had "gone soft".

In 2008's Salvation Run #3, Catman and former Secret Six teammates Scandal and Rag Doll are depicted amongst DC's larger villain population, exiled on a faraway planet.

Catman reappeared in the new Secret Six ongoing series, which takes place after the events of Salvation Run. Blake spent some time back in Africa, where he brutally attacked a gang of poachers and may have left them for dead. His actions have led Catman to wonder if he has the temperament to be on the side of the angels.

It was in his role as leader of the Secret Six that Catman faced Batman again after many years. Batman tried to warn Catman and his team to not accept their mission to break someone out of Alcatraz. The non-personal warning did not work, so Batman went to confront Catman. Catman said in response: "The old me? Probably would've whooped his milk and cookies". He made no hesitation to throw the first punch at the Dark Knight. During the fight, Batman even offered to pay the Secret Six off, but to no avail. Catman's main goal was just to keep Batman distracted as the Secret Six broke Tarantula out of prison.

After the cancellation of the series in August 2011, Gail Simone revealed on her Tumblr that Catman is in fact bisexual, and that she had planned to reveal this in a story arc that was cut short by the September 2011 DC relaunch. Simone has also said that she plans to make this canon the next time she writes Catman in a book.

The New 52
In The New 52 rebooted DC's continuity, Catman made his debut, with an updated outfit, in the December 2014 reboot of Secret Six. In the first issue of the series, he is captured by a mysterious group and is put in a strange holding cell with the new team. As Simone had promised in her earlier tweet, his bisexuality was confirmed in the issue when he is seen flirting with both a man and a woman.

Powers and abilities
Catman is an Olympic-level athlete and skilled hand-to-hand combatant, able to hold his own against some of the most proficient beings and fighters in the DC universe, including Bronze Tiger, Batman, and an actual lion. He is also one of the world's foremost hunters and trackers, possessing an extraordinary sense of smell and sight. He is also a skillful observant with the accurate ability to notice and perceive things.

He wears razor-tipped gauntlets and uses a sharp-edged Catarang, modeled after Batman's Batarang, and a utility belt similar to Batman's. The belt frequently has a smiley face button, a trophy he claimed from a misleading pilot on a mission with the Secret Six. Catman has claimed several times, both in his early appearances and modern ones, that his cape is mystical and able to restore mortal wounds.

He was once the owner of a pet Siberian tiger named Rasputin, which was trained and helped him commit crimes. Rasputin has not been utilized in his modern appearances to date.

Other versions

Batman: Legends of the Dark Knight

In 1993's Batman: Legends of the Dark Knight #46–49 introduced a second Post-Crisis Cat-Man as a leather catsuit-wearing serial killer who murders women with knife-like claws because they remind him of his mentally ill mother. Batman and Catwoman form a shaky alliance to stop him, although they have different agendas: Batman wants to apprehend him, while Catwoman wants him dead.

Flashpoint
In the alternate timeline of the Flashpoint event, Catman (leader of the South African resistance) is brutally murdered by Gorilla Grodd. This leaves Grodd with total control over Africa.

King of the Cats
A character similar to Catman debuted in the 1950s named "King of the Cats". In reality, he was Karl Kyle, brother of Selina Kyle. This version of the character is also a burglar motivated to steal by an intense sibling rivalry with his sister. His crimes torment Catwoman, as she has loyalties to both her brother and her nemesis/love interest, Batman.

In other media

Television
 Thomas Blake appears in The New Batman Adventures episode "Cult of the Cat", voiced by Scott Cleverdon. This version is the leader of a cat-worshiping cult who encounters Catwoman and Batman.
 An unrelated Catman inspired by Batman and Wildcat appears in the Justice League two-part episode "Legends", voiced by Stephen Root.
 Catman appears in Batman: The Brave and the Bold, voiced by Thomas F. Wilson.

Film
 Catman makes a non-speaking cameo appearance in Superman/Batman: Public Enemies.
 Catman makes a minor non-speaking appearance in The Lego Batman Movie.
 Catman makes a non-speaking appearance in Scooby-Doo! & Batman: The Brave and the Bold.
 Catman makes a non-speaking cameo appearance in Injustice.

Video games
Catman appears in Batman: The Brave and the Bold – The Videogame voiced again by Thomas F. Wilson.

Miscellaneous
 Catman appears in The Batman Adventures. This version hues closer to the comics' Thomas Blake, with a history as a former big game hunter who sells live animals to zoos and circuses. Additionally, he dons a masculine variation of Catwoman's suit and commits copycat crimes in an attempt at gaining her romantic attention.
 Catman appears in Batman: Arkham Knight – Genesis as an associate of the Joker, Harley Quinn, and Blockbuster before he is killed by Jason Todd.
 Catman makes a cameo appearance in the final issue of Batman '66.

Reception
In 2013, ComicsAlliance ranked Catman as #9 on their list of the "50 Sexiest Male Characters in Comics".

See also

 List of Batman Family enemies
 List of DC Comics characters

References

External links
 Toonzone.net
 Catman's secret origin on dccomics.com

Characters created by Bill Finger
Comics characters introduced in 1963
DC Comics male superheroes
DC Comics LGBT superheroes
DC Comics martial artists
DC Comics male supervillains
DC Comics LGBT supervillains
Fictional bisexual males
Fictional businesspeople
Fictional hunters
Fictional mercenaries in comics
Fictional serial killers
Vigilante characters in comics
Batman characters